The AN/USQ-20, or CP-642 or Naval Tactical Data System (NTDS), was designed as a more reliable replacement for the Seymour Cray-designed AN/USQ-17 with the same instruction set. The first batch of 17 computers were delivered to the Navy starting in early 1961. 

A version of the AN/USQ-20 for use by the other military services and NASA was designated the UNIVAC 1206. Another version, designated the G-40, replaced the vacuum tube UNIVAC 1104 in the BOMARC Missile Program.

Technical 
The machine was the size and shape of an old-fashioned double-door refrigerator, about six feet tall (roughly 1.80 meters).

Instructions were represented as 30-bit words in the following format:
   f  6 bits   function code 
   j  3 bits   jump condition designator 
   k  3 bits   partial word designator 
   b  3 bits   which index register to use 
   y  15 bits  operand address in memory

Numbers were represented as 30-bit words. This allowed for five 6-bit alphanumeric characters per word.

The main memory was 32,768 words of core memory.

The available processor registers were:
One 30-bit arithmetic (A) register.
A contiguous 30-bit Q register (total of 60 bits for the result of multiplication or the dividend in division).
Seven 15-bit index (B) registers (note: register B0 is always zero).

See also
CMS-2
List of UNIVAC products
History of computing hardware
Military computers

References

External links 
UNIVAC-NTDS: UNIVAC 1206, AN/USQ-20 – From the Antique Computer website

UNIVAC hardware
Transistorized computers
Military computers
Avionics computers
Military electronics of the United States